Aspen  is a small community in the Canadian province of Nova Scotia, located in the Municipality of the District of St. Mary's in Guysborough County.

References
Aspen on Destination Nova Scotia

Communities in Guysborough County, Nova Scotia